Bradfordton is a rural unincorporated community located in Gardner Township, Sangamon County, Illinois. It is located on Illinois Route 97, 4.5 miles (18 km) northwest of Springfield.

The rural hamlet is the site of the Bradfordton Co-Op, a grain elevator. It was once the site of a whistle stop on the Baltimore and Ohio Railroad line from Springfield to Beardstown.

References

Unincorporated communities in Sangamon County, Illinois
Springfield metropolitan area, Illinois
Unincorporated communities in Illinois